The Third Pashinyan government, which was formed on 6 August 2021, is the current executive branch of the government of Armenia. Nikol Pashinyan continued in his role as prime minister after his Civil Contract Party's victory in the 2021 Armenian snap parliamentary elections.

Structure

See also 
 Politics of Armenia

References 

Nikol Pashinyan
Politics of Armenia
Cabinets established in 2021
2021 establishments in Armenia
Pashinyan